Jakob may refer to:

People
 Jakob (given name), including a list of people with the name
 Jakob (surname), including a list of people with the name

Other
 Jakob (band), a New Zealand band, and the title of their 1999 EP
 Max Jakob Memorial Award, annual award to scholars in the field of heat transfer 
 Ohel Jakob synagogue (Munich)

See also
 Jacob (disambiguation)
 St. Jacob (disambiguation)